The Dawson Lounge is the smallest pub in Dublin. Located in a basement near the St Stephen's Green end of Dawson Street, it has a capacity of 40 people.

References

Pubs in Dublin (city)